Pungtungia hilgendorfi is a species of cyprinid fish found in Japan.

Named in honor of German zoologist and paleontologist Franz Hilgendorf (1839-1904), lecturer at the Imperial Medical Academy Tokyo (1873-1876), whereupon he published articles and collected several specimens of Japanese fauna.

References

Pungtungia
Taxa named by Henry Weed Fowler
Taxa named by David Starr Jordan
Fish described in 1903